The Erdős–Anning theorem states that an infinite number of points in the plane can have mutual integer distances only if all the points lie on a straight line. It is named after Paul Erdős and Norman H. Anning, who published a proof of it in 1945.

Rationality versus integrality

Although there can be no infinite non-collinear set of points with integer distances, there are infinite non-collinear sets of points whose distances are rational numbers. The (still unsolved) Erdős–Ulam problem asks whether there can exist a dense set of points in the plane at rational distances from each other.

For any finite set S of points at rational distances from each other, it is possible to find a similar set of points at integer distances from each other, by expanding S by a factor of the least common denominator of the distances in S. Therefore, there exist arbitrarily large finite sets of non-collinear points with integer distances from each other. However, including more points into S may cause the expansion factor to increase, so this construction does not allow infinite sets of points at rational distances to be transformed into infinite sets of points at integer distances.

Proof 

Shortly after the original publication of the Erdős–Anning theorem, Erdős provided the following proof. It is simpler than the original proof, and has the additional benefit of bounding the number of points in a set with integer distances as a function of the maximum distance between the points (the diameter of the set). More specifically, if a set of three non-collinear points have integer distances, all at most some number , then at most  points (including the three given points) have integer distances from all three. Therefore, any set of non-collinear points, all at integer distances at most  from each other, can have at most  points in total.

To see this, let ,  and  be three non-collinear members of a set  of points with integer distances, and let  denote the Euclidean distance function. From the triangle inequality it follows that  is a non-negative integer and is at most .

The quadratic dependence of this bound on  can be improved: every non-collinear point set with integer distances and diameter  has size . However, it is not possible to replace  by the minimum distance between the points: there exist arbitrarily large non-collinear point sets with integer distances and with minimum distance two.

Maximal point sets with integral distances

An alternative way of stating the theorem is that a non-collinear set of points in the plane with integer distances can only be extended by adding finitely many additional points, before no more points can be added. A set of points with both integer coordinates and integer distances, to which no more can be added while preserving both properties, forms an Erdős–Diophantine graph.

References

Arithmetic problems of plane geometry
Theorems in discrete mathematics
Articles containing proofs
Theorems in discrete geometry
Anning theorem